The 1923–24 Michigan Wolverines men's basketball team represented the University of Michigan in intercollegiate basketball during the 1923–24 season. The team compiled a record of 10–7, and 6–5 against Big Ten Conference opponents.  Michigan finished fifth in the Big Ten. Ohio State won the Big ten championship with a record of 10–1, the only loss being a 39–29 game against Michigan. E. J. Mather was in his sixth year as the team's coach, and George Haggarty was the team captain and leading scorer.

Schedule

Players
Edward W. Chambers, Niles, Michigan - forward and varsity letter winner 
Royal F. Cherry, Grand Rapids, Michigan - guard and varsity letter winner
Richard F. Doyle, Galesburg, Michigan - center and varsity letter winner
Douglas R. Ginn, Detroit, Michigan  - aMa letter winner
Bruce Robert Gregory - 
George Haggarty,, Ypsilanti, Michigan - team captain, forward and varsity letter winner
Raymond E. Hutzel, Ann Abor, Michigan - forward and varsity letter winner
Carl C. Kressbach, Monroe, Michigan - aMa letter winner
Franklin C. Kuenzel, Grand Rapids, Michigan - aMa letter winner 
Walter A. Kuenzel, Grand Rapids, Michigan - forward and varsity letter winner 
Joseph M. Landre, Binghamton, New York - guard and varsity letter winner
Edward D. Line, Detroit, Michigan - 
Nathan Rasnick, Newark, New Jersey - aMa letter winner
Rex G. Reason, Detroit, Michigan - forward and varsity letter winner

Scoring statistics

Coaching staff
E. J. Mather - coach
Justin S. Compton - manager
Fielding H. Yost - athletic director

References

Michigan
Michigan Wolverines men's basketball seasons
Michigan Wolverines basketball
Michigan Wolverines basketball